Todirești is a commune in Iași County, Western Moldavia, Romania. It is composed of three villages: Băiceni, Stroești and Todirești. It also included three other villages until 2004, when these were split off to form Hărmănești Commune.

References

Communes in Iași County
Localities in Western Moldavia